Renn Woods (born Ren Woods; January 1, 1958) is an American film, television and stage actress, vocalist and songwriter. She is best known for her role as Fanta in Roots, and also for her performance of Aquarius in the film version of Hair (1979).

Woods was born in Chicago and raised in Portland, Oregon, where she attracted attention as part of Three Little Souls, a local musical trio she formed at age ten. The group subsequently became known as Sunday's Child, and toured internationally through Wood's adolescent years, appearing on television with such acts as Bob Hope. In adulthood, Woods transitioned into acting, starring as Fanta in Roots (1977), and the Aquarius soloist in Hair (1979). She also had a supporting role in the comedy The Jerk (1979).

She has also appeared onstage as Dorothy in the first national touring production of The Wiz, and as The Moon in a critically acclaimed stage production of Caroline, or Change.

Early life
Woods was born in Chicago, Illinois, one of six children, and was raised in Portland, Oregon by her divorced mother, who was a nurse. Woods described her mother as a "politically conscious and very unusual woman." Woods and her siblings attended private Catholic schools in Portland. At age eight, Woods began singing in a trio with two friends in her neighborhood, performing as the Three Little Souls.

She added an extra "n" to her first name to lessen confusion with a company that used the domain name Renwoods.

Career beginnings
Renn began singing at the age of six. By age 10, she and two girlfriends began performing under the group name Sunday's Child, and performed on television programs with Jack Benny, Bob Hope, and Bing Crosby. The trio toured the world, performing the very last tour of duty with Bob Hope in Vietnam.

In 1979, she released a solo album, Out of the Woods, which was produced by Earth, Wind & Fire member Al McKay. A second album, Azz Izz, was released in 1982. Azz Izz was well received. The second album featured a new composition by Prince titled "I Don't Wanna Stop." Woods released a third album featuring jazz standards, Crazy, in 2015.

Renn is currently recording her first American Songbook CD.

Acting career
Woods first came to national attention in the role of Dorothy in the first national Broadway tour of "The Wiz" in 1976. She subsequently appeared as Fanta in Roots in 1977,  a role for which she won a People's Choice Award. She also sang the opening song Aquarius in Miloš Forman’s movie musical version of Hair (1979). She appeared in other American television series, including What's Happening!!, Lou Grant, Hill Street Blues, The White Shadow, The Jeffersons, Roc, Sabrina, the Teenage Witch, Beauty and the Beast and NYPD Blue. She starred as Edie in the Golden Globe-winning tv series Beauty and the Beast. She starred as Mrs. McGill in the tv movie Detention: The Siege at Johnson High.

In 2015, she appeared in the TVOne documentary series Unsung. In 2016, she appeared in the TruInside tv documentary The Jerk, about the film she had co-starred in with Steve Martin, exploring what makes the comedy a classic.

Woods created a one-woman autobiographical musical, A Diva Like Me, in the 1990s, which she expanded into an ensemble version, Sold: Renn Woods in Concert (A Play in Rhythm and Blues).

She also appeared in the Tony Award-nominated production of "Caroline, Or Change"  (the role of "The Moon") at the Ahmanson Theatre in Los Angeles.

Filmography

Film

Television

References

External links

1958 births
Living people
Actresses from Portland, Oregon
20th-century African-American women singers
American television actresses
American musical theatre actresses
African-American actresses
American film actresses
African Americans in Oregon
Musicians from Portland, Oregon
African-American history of Oregon
21st-century African-American people
21st-century African-American women